Francoa appendiculata is a species of the Francoaceae family which consists of herbs endemic to Chile.

Plants may grow up to one metre high and produce basal clumps of round, deeply lobed, dark green, fuzzy leaves with winged leafstalks. Compact racemes of small, cup-shaped flowers, which are pink with red markings, appear in summer and early fall.

References

 
 GBIF entry
 ChileFlora entry

appendiculata
Endemic flora of Chile
Taxa named by Antonio José Cavanilles